Charles Leach Hardy (January 24, 1919 – December 24, 2010) was a United States district judge of the United States District Court for the District of Arizona.

Education and career

Born in Los Angeles, California, Hardy was a Captain in the United States Army Field Artillery during World War II, from 1941 to 1946. He received a Bachelor of Science degree from the University of Arizona in 1947 and a Bachelor of Laws from the James E. Rogers College of Law at the University of Arizona in 1950. He was in private practice in Phoenix, Arizona from 1949 to 1952. He was a deputy county attorney of Maricopa County, Arizona from 1952 to 1955, entering private practice in Scottsdale, Arizona in 1956. He was an assistant state attorney general of Arizona from 1957 to 1959, returning to private practice in Phoenix from 1959 to 1966. He was a judge of the Superior Court of Maricopa County, Arizona from 1967 to 1980.

Federal judicial service

On April 2, 1980, Hardy was nominated by President Jimmy Carter to a seat on the United States District Court for the District of Arizona vacated by Judge Walter Early Craig. Hardy was confirmed by the United States Senate on May 21, 1980, and received his commission on May 23, 1980. He assumed senior status on June 2, 1990. He died on December 24, 2010, in Tempe, Arizona.

References

Sources
 

1919 births
2010 deaths
University of Arizona alumni
James E. Rogers College of Law alumni
Judges of the United States District Court for the District of Arizona
United States district court judges appointed by Jimmy Carter
20th-century American judges
United States Army officers
Superior court judges in the United States
United States Army personnel of World War II